Pohuwato is a regency of Gorontalo Province, Indonesia. It is located on the island of Sulawesi. It was established in 2003 under Law Number (Undang-Undang Nomor) 6/2003 by splitting off from the western part of Boalemo Regency. It has an area of 4,244.31 km2, and had a population of 128,748 at the 2010 Census and 146,432 at the 2020 Census; the official estimate as at mid 2021 was 147,689. The seat of the regency administration is in the town of Marisa.

Administrative Districts 
Pohuwato Regency is divided into thirteen districts (kecamatan), tabulated below with their areas and their populations at the 2010 Census and the 2020 Census, together with the official estimates as at mid 2021. The table also includes the locations of the district administrative centres, the number of administrative villages (rural desa and urban kelurahan) in each district, and its postal codes.

Notes: (a) including 17 offshore islands. (b) including 25 offshore islands. (c) including 3 offshore islands. (d) including 3 offshore islands.

References

Regencies of Gorontalo